Charles d'Armagnac, born 1425, died June 3, 1497, in Castelnau-de-Montmiral at the age of 72 years, was Count of Armagnac and Rodez from 1473 to 1497. He was the son of John IV, Count of Armagnac and Rodez, and Isabella d'Évreux. His older brother, Count John V, was a leader of the League of the Public Weal against King Louis XI of France, causing Charles to be imprisoned for fifteen years. John was killed in a skirmish, allowing Charles to inherit the title of Count of Armagnac.

Marriage and children
He married on November 26, 1468, Catherine de Foix Candale (d. 1510), daughter of Jean de Foix and Margaret Kerdeston. They had no children.

Charles had an illegitimate child;
 Peter, Baron de Caussade.

Count of Armagnac
Charles d'Armagnac died (1497) without legitimate issue and the title of Count of Armagnac was conferred upon Charles IV, Duke of Alençon.

Notes

References
 Archives historiques de la Gascogne, Vol.14–16, Ed. Société historique de Gascogne, Cocharaux Frères Imprimerie, 1887.
 Catholic world, Vol.9, Ed. Paulist Fathers, The Catholic Publication House, 1869.
 Revue de Gascogne: bulletin bimestrial de la Société historique, Vol.34, Imprimerie et Lithographie G. Foix, 1893.

Counts of Armagnac
1425 births
1497 deaths